Time Expired may refer to:

 Time Expired (1992 film)
 Time Expired (2011 film)